Xoana Soledad Iacoi (born 3 June 1992) is an Argentine handball player for Cideco Handball and the Argentina women's national handball team.

She defended Argentina at the 2015 World Women's Handball Championship in Denmark.

References

Argentine female handball players
1992 births
Living people
Handball players at the 2016 Summer Olympics
Olympic handball players of Argentina
South American Games silver medalists for Argentina
South American Games medalists in handball
Competitors at the 2018 South American Games
20th-century Argentine women
21st-century Argentine women